Carrie Anton (born 8 October 1969) is a retired Canadian goalball player who competed in international level events. She is a national goalball coach in Edmonton.

References

1969 births
Living people
Sportspeople from Regina, Saskatchewan
Paralympic goalball players of Canada
Goalball players at the 2000 Summer Paralympics
Medalists at the 2000 Summer Paralympics
Paralympic medalists in goalball
Paralympic gold medalists for Canada